Better Luck Next Time may refer to:
 Better Luck Next Time (band), an American pop punk band
 Better Luck Next Time (Better Luck Next Time album) (2006)
 Better Luck Next Time (The Stix album) (2005)
 "Better Luck Next Time" (The Outer Limits), a 1999 episode of The Outer Limits
 "Better Luck Next Time" – a song by Irving Berlin interpolated into Top Hat (musical) (2011)
 "Better Luck Next Time" - a song by Kelsea Ballerini (2019)